Bernadetto de' Medici (died after 1576) was an Italian patrician who moved from Florence to Naples and established the Ottaiano branch of Medici - one of two Medici branches still extant.

Biography 
A member of a cadet branch of the Medici family (the one later called the Princes of Ottajano), he was the son of Ottaviano de' Medici and Francesca Salviati. In 1559, he married Giulia de' Medici, the illegitimate daughter of Duke Alessandro de' Medici by Taddea Malespina.

In 1567, he bought the seigniory of Ottaiano in the Kingdom of Naples from Cesare I Gonzaga and moved there, probably due to strife with Grand Duke Cosimo I. He died in Naples after 1576.

His son Alessandro (died 1606) was Lord of Ottaiano and General of the Papal States. His descendants unsuccessfully claimed the title of Grand Duke of Tuscany after the extinction of the main branch of the Medici family.

Marriage and descendants 
Bernardetto married the illegitimate daughter of the Duke Alessandro de 'Medici, Giulia in 1559. It was her second marriage after the death of her first husband Francesco Cantelmi, Duke of Popoli. They had a son:

Alessandro († 1606). Lord of Ottaiano, general of the pontifical army since April 1605, governor of Borgo.

References 

Bernadetto
16th-century Italian nobility
16th-century births
16th-century deaths
16th-century Neapolitan people